The 1950 Bowling Green Falcons football team was an American football team that represented Bowling Green State University as an independent during the 1950 college football season. The team was led by tenth-year head coach Robert Whittaker. The Falcons compiled a 3–4–2 record and were outscored by a combined total of 188 to 134.

Schedule

References

Bowling Green
Bowling Green Falcons football seasons
Bowling Green Falcons football